Jorge Pardo is a Spanish flautist and saxophonist born 1 December 1956 in Madrid, known for the albums he released for Milestone Records in the 1990s. He has been a side musician of famous flamenco guitarist Paco de Lucia and also with American jazz legend Chick Corea. He occasionally joins the Al andalus ensemble for performances.

Discography
Albums
 1982: Jorge Pardo (Blau)
 1984: El canto de los Guerreros (Linterna)
 1991: In a Minute (Milestone)
 1991: Las cigarras son quizá sordas (Milestone)
 1993: Veloz hacia su sino (Milestone)
 1995: 10 de Paco (Milestone) (with Chano Dominguez)
 1997: 2332 (Nuevos Medios)
 2001: Mira (Nuevos Medios)
 2005: Vientos Flamencos (Manantial de Músicas)
 2009: Vientos Flamencos 2 (Flamenco World Music)
 2012: Huellas
 2013: Puerta del Sol
 2014: Historias De Radha Y Krishna
 2016: Djinn
 2020: Brooklyn Sessions (with Gil Goldstein)

Contributing artist
 1997: The Rough Guide to Flamenco (World Music Network)
 1997: Ur (Al Sur) with Michel Bismut, Keyvan Chemirani,Nabil Khalidi
 2019: Antidote (Chick Corea album)

References

External link

1956 births
Living people
Milestone Records artists
Latin music songwriters